Calathus bosnicus is a species of ground beetle from the Platyninae subfamily that is can  be found in Albania and Bosnia and Herzegovina.

References

bosnicus
Beetles described in 1891
Beetles of Europe